Mehisti Hanım (born Atiye Akalsba;  1890 –  1964) was the fourth wife of Abdulmejid II, the last Caliph of the Ottoman Caliphate.

Early life
Mehisti Hanım was born in 1890 in Adapazarı, Istanbul. Born as Atiye Akalsba, she was member of Abkhazian noble family, Akalsba. Her father was Hacımaf Efendi Akalsba and her mother was Safiye Hanım. She had one brother, Fazıl Bey, and two sisters, Mihridil Hanım, and Mihrivefa Hanım. 

In 1895, at aged five, her father entrusted her to the Yıldız Palace's imperial harem. Here her name according to the custom of the Ottoman court was changed to Mehisti. She was then sent to the harem of Şehzade Abdulmejid.

Marriage
Mehisti married Abdulmejid on 16 April 1912 in the Bağlarbaşı Palace. Dürrüşehvar Sultan, the couple's only daughter was born in the Çamlıca Palace on 26 January 1914.

At the exile of the imperial family in March 1924, she followed her husband and the other members of his entourage. They moved firstly to Switzerland and then to France where they settled in Paris. During exile, her daughter, Dürrüşehvar married Prince Azam Jah, the eldest son and heir of the last Nizam of Hyderabad State, Osman Ali Khan, Asif Jah VII, at Nice, on 12 November 1931, and went to live in British India. 

After her marriage, Dürrüşehvar took Mehisti with her. But, when the family traveled from India to Europe, and came to France, she and her daughter would stay with Abdulmejid. Neslişah notes that before Dürrüşehvar's marriage Mehisti was allowed to eat in the second sitting, along with Abdulmejid's third wife Hayrünnisa Hanım, the secretaries Behruze and Ofelya and other Kalfas. However, after her marriage, Mehisti's position changed, and she was allowed to eat at the first sitting.

Abdulmejid was interested in classical music. At times, he would perform with his wives, and the kalfas. He would be at the piano, Şehsuvar Hanım and Hayrünnisa Hanım would play the violin, and Mehisti the cello.

Death
After Abdulmejid's death in 1944, Mehisti settled in London. She died in 1964, and was buried in Brookwood Cemetery. After Dürrüşehvar's death in 2006, she was buried beside her.

Issue

See also
Ottoman Imperial Harem

References

Sources

1890 births
1964 deaths
20th-century Ottoman royalty
People from the Ottoman Empire of Abkhazian descent
Burials at Brookwood Cemetery